Goenka College of Commerce and Business Administration is a commerce college of India. It is a Kolkata-based degree-granting college that offers undergraduate and postgraduate degrees in commerce, and an MBA degree course. It is affiliated with the University of Calcutta. Earlier it was a part of Presidency College, Kolkata, where it started as a department but later with growing demand it had to be shifted into its new premises as a separate institute under the University of Calcutta.

Courses
Geonka College offers undergraduate as well as postgraduate courses in commerce and business. These are: B.Com (Hons), M.Com and MBA.

Admission procedure and cutoffs

The college has a strict online application process. The admission procedure for its flagship B Com (Hons.) is rigorous with the percentile cut offs basis Class 12 Examination marks is around 97% The total percentage of the best 4 subjects in Class 12 Finals are considered. Mathematics is not mandatory in Class 12 for B.Com. (Hons), unlike other colleges.

Accommodation

Currently, the college has no hostel of its own but a few seats in the Eden Hindu Hostel is usually made available to the students of B.Com. (Honours) Course (Boys only) of this college. Students can also stay in paying guests nearby.

Notable alumni
 Uttam Kumar, Actor, Singer, Composer and Filmmaker.
 Biman Bandyopadhyay, Politician.
 Rajatava Dutta, Actor.
 Abir Chatterjee, Actor.

See also 
List of colleges affiliated to the University of Calcutta
Education in India
Education in West Bengal

References

External links

Universities and colleges in Kolkata
Educational institutions established in 1905
University of Calcutta affiliates
Commerce colleges in India
1905 establishments in India